Colonel General Vitéz Gusztáv Jány (born Gusztáv Hautzinger; 21 October 1883 in Rajka, Kingdom of Hungary; died 26 November 1947 in Budapest, Hungary) was a Hungarian officer during World War II who commanded the Hungarian Second Army at the Battle of Stalingrad. After the war, he was found guilty of war crimes and executed by firing squad. He was posthumously exonerated in 1993 by the Supreme Court of Hungary.

Awards
 Hungarian Gold Medal of Bravery
 Iron Cross (1914) 2nd Class
 Iron Cross (1939) 1st Class
 Knight's Cross of the Iron Cross (March 31, 1943)

Notes

References

 
 

1883 births
1947 deaths
Burials at Farkasréti Cemetery
People from Győr-Moson-Sopron County
Hungarian generals
Austro-Hungarian military personnel of World War I
Hungarian military personnel of World War II
Hungarian soldiers
Recipients of the Knight's Cross of the Iron Cross
Executed Hungarian people
People executed by Hungary by firing squad
People executed for war crimes